Ascalenia pancrypta is a moth in the family Cosmopterigidae. It was described by Edward Meyrick in 1915. It is found in Cuba.

References

Moths described in 1915
Ascalenia
Moths of the Caribbean
Endemic fauna of Cuba